Salvatore D'Aula or Aula (22 April 1718 – 1782) was an Italian priest, Latin scholar, and archeologist. He was born in Naples, and studied in the local seminary under Carlo Maiello. He was selected by King Charles VII of Naples in 1755 to be a member of a newly formed Accademia Ercolanese to assess artifacts from Pompeii and the newly discovered town of Herculaneum. He taught rhetoric in Greek and Latin at the seminary. He published in Latin in two volumes in 1778 a book about Roman culture and artifacts, titled Antiquitatum Romanarum Epitome ad usum Seminarii Neapoletano.

References

1718 births
1782 deaths
18th-century Italian writers
18th-century Italian male writers
Italian archaeologists
People from Naples